Fruithurst is a town in Cleburne County, Alabama, United States. At the 2020 census, the population was 235.

Geography

Fruithurst is located at 33°43'51.971" North, 85°25'54.332" West (33.731103, −85.431759).

History

Fruithurst once had a reputation for being a notorious speed trap along US Highway 78. Abuse of policing reached such an extent that in 1975 Alabama Attorney General Bill Baxley set up an office in the town, personally pledging to provide criminal defense to any person arrested or cited in the town. Additionally  Reason magazine reported in May 2022 that, "...one case involved a woman arrested for traveling 58 in a 55-mph zone. She was also charged with transporting untaxed liquor—a half-empty miniature bottle of liqueur in her purse..." stating this was, "...both an abuse of law enforcement powers and a mockery of the very idea of legitimate traffic safety enforcement."

Demographics

At the 2000 census there were 270 people in 107 households, including 74 families, in the city. The racial makeup of the city was 99.63% White and 0.37% Black or African American. 0.74% of the population were Hispanic or Latino of any race.
Of the 107 households 30.8% had children under the age of 18 living with them, 53.3% were married couples living together, 10.3% had a female householder with no husband present, and 30.8% were non-families. 28.0% of households were one person and 13.1% were one person aged 65 or older. The average household size was 2.41 and the average family size was 2.93.

The age distribution was 20.4% under the age of 18, 12.6% from 18 to 24, 24.4% from 25 to 44, 27.8% from 45 to 64, and 14.8% 65 or older. The median age was 38 years. For every 100 females, there were 98.5 males. For every 100 females age 18 and over, there were 87.0 males.

The median household income was $27,813 and the median family income  was $31,667. Males had a median income of $22,188 versus $16,250 for females. The per capita income for the city was $18,130. About 17.0% of families and 17.9% of the population were below the poverty line, including 19.5% of those under the age of eighteen and 2.6% of those sixty five or over.

References 

Towns in Alabama
Towns in Cleburne County, Alabama